Maria Izolda Cela de Arruda Coelho (born Sobral, Ceará, 9 May 1960) is a Brazilian professor, psychologist, politician and the first female governor in the history of the Brazilian state of Ceará. Affiliated to the Democratic Labour Party (PDT) until 2022, she is the former vice-governor of Ceará and the current 60st governor of the same state. She assumed the post after the resignation of Camilo Santana.

Biography 
Born in the municipality of Sobral, Ceará, Izolda Cela is the daughter of Maria Helena Cela (1928-2001), an elementary school teacher born in Camocim, Ceará, and Afonso Walter Magalhães Pinto (1916-1969), a cardiologist from Santa Quitéria.

Graduated in psychology at the Federal University of Ceará (UFC), she became academically specialized in Early Childhood Education at the State University of Ceará and also in Public Management at the Vale do Acaraú State University, where she became a pedagogy teacher years later. She became a Master in Management and Evaluation of Public Education from the Federal University of Juiz de Fora, in Minas Gerais. Before entering public life, Izolda worked as a school psychologist at Colégio Sobralense (1986 and 1988), was part of the pedagogical board of the Arco-Iris School (1989), and gained clinical experience in child care when working at the Integrated Development Clinic (1991-1995), all in the municipality of Sobral.

In addition, Izolda Cela is the great-niece of the painter Raimundo Cela, and she's married for over 30 years to the lawyer and former mayor of Sobral, José Clodoveu de Arruda Coelho Neto (PT), with whom she had four children: Hilda, Luisa, Clara and Pedro.

Political life 
In 2001, Izolda Cela began her political career by assuming the position of Undersecretary for Education Development in the municipal administration of Sobral, Ceará, a position she remained in until 2004. Between 2005 and 2006, she served as the Municipal Secretary of Education and, between 2007 and 2014, as Secretary of Education of the State of Ceará.

In 2014 Ceará state election, she ran for the first time as the running mate of Camilo Santana (PT) for the government of Ceará. She was affiliated to the Republican Party of the Social Order (PROS). Reaching the sum of 2,039,233 votes in the 1st round, 47.81% of the valid votes, and 2,417,668 votes in the 2nd round, 53.35% of the valid votes, the ticket won the electoral dispute and Izolda was elected the first female Vice Governor of the state of Ceará. On August 14, 2015, Izolda was considered the first woman to assume the government of Ceará, due to Governor Camilo's official trip for a week.

In the 2018 Ceará state election, Izolda ran again for the position of Vice Governor of the State of Ceará on the ticket of incumbent governor Camilo Santana. Now affiliated to the Democratic Labour Party (PDT), the ticket garnered 3,457,556 votes (equivalent to 79.96% of valid votes), winning the dispute in the 1st round of the elections.

On April 2, 2022, Santana resigned as governor to run for the Federal Senate, which made Izolda Cela the new governor and the first woman in history to command the state of Ceará.

Electoral results

References 

1960 births
Living people
People from Sobral, Ceará
Democratic Labour Party (Brazil) politicians
Workers' Party (Brazil) politicians
Brazilian politicians
Republican Party of the Social Order politicians
Governors of Ceará
Federal University of Ceará alumni